The Men's high jump event at the 1998 World Junior Championships in Athletics was held in Annecy, France, at Parc des Sports on 30 and 31 July.

Medalists

Results

Final
31 July

Qualifications
30 Jul

Group A

Group B

Participation
According to an unofficial count, 30 athletes from 20 countries participated in the event.

References

High jump
High jump at the World Athletics U20 Championships